Bruno of Altena-Isenberg (died 1258), known as Bruno of Isenberg, was Prince-Bishop of Osnabrück from 1250 to his death. He succeeded his brother Engelbert III as Prince-Bishop.

History
The Diocese of Osnabrück, established in 772, was founded by Charlemagne, in order to Christianize the conquered stem-duchy. The Prince-Bishopric of Osnabrück was an ecclesiastical principality of the Holy Roman Empire from 1225 to 1803, with its capital at Osnabrück.

Biography
Bruno was the fourth son of Count Arnold of Altena from his marriage to Mathilde of Cleves, daughter of Dietrich III, Count of Cleves and Adelheid of Sülzbach. Like his four other brothers, Dietrich III, Bishop of Munster, Engelbert Bishop of Osnabrück (1224–1250), Philipp, priest in Cologne (1264), and Gottfried, priest in Münster (1246); Bruno was destined for an ecclesiastical function. In the chronicle Chronicon Episcopi Münster Bruno is mentioned on 18 July 1226: "Quare ipse episcopus Thiderieus et frater suus Bruno episcopus Osnabrügensis". He was then a deacon in the diocese of Osnabrück, where his brother Engelbert had become bishop two years earlier. The brothers Diederik of Altena-Isenberg and Engelbert of Altena-Isenberg had been on their way back from their visit to the Pope since May.

Return from Rome
Bruno's brother Dietrich died on their return journey and Engelbert was not formally aware that they had been dropped off. The occasion was the event three quarters of a year earlier, when their older brother Count Frederik of Isenberg was involved in the death of their uncle Engelbert II of Berg, Archbishop of the Electorate of Cologne, on 27 November 1225 in Gevelsberg. After his rehabilitation, their brother Engelbert of Altena-Isenberg was restored to his former office in 1237.

Rehabilitation
Bruno succeeded in 1250 after his brother Engelbert died. Both could defend themselves against the accusation of being complicit after 1226, because they had not been at the talks with Count Frederik in Soest the night before the death of their uncle Engelbert of Berg. But his brother Diederick was. Still, it is unlikely that he, too, was aware. As a bishop, he was better able to assess the consequences. In addition, he knew that Archbishop Engelbert was a trained swordsman, who (as a cleric) had held home (as a cleric) with cousin Adolf I von der Mark for forty days in southern France against the Cathars in 1212, killing 400 inhabitants of Béziers who did not want to be converted; they were burned at the stake.

Family interest
Bruno was also an important advocate for his young cousins, the surviving sons of his brother Frederik, who were raised by their uncle Henry IV, Duke of Limburg at his stronghold Limburg on the Vesdre. He was on 17 July 1242 with his other brothers (Willem, the youngest is not mentioned) as witness to the party in the transfer of the fief of the castle of Limburg to the Lenne to their uncle Henry IV, Duke of Limburg.

Mediator role
Bruno appears frequently in preserved charters of Bishop Engelbert III of Osnabrück. He himself appears in charters after 1250, such as two years before his death, on 20 and 24 August 1256, when he played a prominent role as a mediator in the conflict between the Cologne Archbishop Coenraad of Hochstaden with the Cathedral Chapter against the Bishop of Paderborn, Simon I of Lippe with his Dom chapter on disputed land ownership in Salzkotten. Coins that were minted in Weidenbrück are known from Bruno as the master of the mint.

Literature 

 MAX PLANCK INSTITUT Die Bistümmer Der Kirchprovinz Köln. Report: Walter De Gruyter-Berlin-New York. Das Bistum Münster 6. Klaus Scholz 1995. Das Stift Alter Dom St. Paulus zu Münster .
 Rudolf vom Bruch. Die Rittersitze des Furstentums Osnabrück. Busy. H.Th. Wenner. Der Martinshof Blatt 400.
 Westfälische Zeitschrift 107, 1957 / Internet-Portal "Westfälische Geschichte" URL: http://www.westfaelische-zeitschrift.lwl.org

Sources

 [WestfUB] Die Urkunden des kölnischen Westfalens vom Jahre 1200–1300, Münster 1908 Westfälisches Urkundenbuch 3 und 7.
 [OsnabUB] Philippi, F.: Osnabrücker Urkundenbuch. 4. bdn. M.Bar Osnabruck 1892–1902.
 [Counts of Limburg Hohenlimburg] Van Limburg, H. 2016. Dutch: Graven van Limburg Hohenlimburg & Broich. Printing house: Pro-Book Utrecht 2016. 
 [Urkunde 10, Herford] Original A 235 I Stift St. Johann und Dionys, Herford
 [Regest vol. 01. Counts of Limburg] Counts of Limburg Hohenlimburg & Broich. Regesten Part 01 Page 29-64 charters and transcriptions period 1205-1250

References

Year of birth unknown
1258 deaths
Roman Catholic Prince-Bishops of Osnabrück